The Landlord and Tenant Act 1851 (14 and 15 Vict c.25) is an Act of the Parliament of the United Kingdom that regulates the relationship between tenants and their landlords.

References

United Kingdom Acts of Parliament 1851
Landlord–tenant law